Swifterbant is a town in the Dutch province of Flevoland. It is a part of the municipality of Dronten, and lies about 13 km northeast of Lelystad.

On 1 January 2014, Swifterbant had 6475 inhabitants.

Archaeology

The town also gave its name to a neolithic Swifterbant culture dated to between 5300 and 3400 BC, before the Roman Warm Period and follow-on Dunkirk transgressions.

References

External links 
 

Populated places in Flevoland
Dronten